The XIII Fighter Command  was a United States Army Air Forces formation. It was last assigned to Thirteenth Air Force, based at Manila, Luzon, Philippines. It was inactivated on 15 March 1946.

History
XIII Fighter Command was a World War II command and control organization for Thirteenth Air Force. Its mission was to provide command and control authority of Army Air Force fighter organizations within the Thirteenth Air Force Area of Responsibility.

It participated in the following campaigns: China Defensive; Guadal¬canal; New Guinea; Northern Solomons; Bismarck Archipelago; Western Pacific; Leyte; Luzon; Southern Philippines; China Offensive.

Lineage
 Constituted as the XIII Fighter Command on 14 December 1942
 Activated on 13 January 1943
 Inactivated on 15 March 1946
 Disbanded on 8 October 1948

Assignments
 Thirteenth Air Force, 13 January 1943 – 15 March 1946

Stations
 Plaine Des Gaiacs Airfield, New Caledonia, Melanesia, 13 January 1943
 Pekoa Airfield, Espiritu Santo, New Hebrides, 22 January 1943
 Carney Airfield, Guadalcanal, Solomon Islands, December 1943
 Sansapor (March) Airfield, Netherlands East Indies, 15 August 1944
 Bayug Airfield, Burauen, Leyte, Philippines, 10 January 1945
 Puerto Princesa Airfield, Palawan, Philippines, 1 March 1945
 Manila, Luzon, Philippines, November 1945 – 15 March 1946

Components
 Groups
 18th Fighter Group, 14 April 1943 – 15 March 1946
 42nd Bombardment Group, attached 1 October 1944 – 8 January 1945, c. 22 March – c. September 1945
 347th Fighter Group: 13 January 1943 – 1 January 1946 (attached to I Island Command 1 July – c. 29 December 1943)
 414th Fighter Group: 1 January–30 September 1946

 Squadrons
 17th Photographic Reconnaissance Squadron: 10 December 1945 – 1 February 1946
 419th Night Fighter Squadron: 25 August 1944 – 10 January 1946
 550th Night Fighter Squadron: 12 December 1944 – 15 December 1945 (attached to XIII Bomber Command 14 February 1945, 85th Fighter Wing 7 April – c. 17 June 1945)

See also
 United States Army Air Forces in the South Pacific Area

References

Notes
 Explanatory notes

 Citations

Bibliography

 
 

13 Command Fighter
Military units and formations established in 1943
Military units and formations disestablished in 1946